The Rites of Zhou, originally known as "Officers of Zhou" is a work on bureaucracy and organizational theory. It was renamed by Liu Xin to differentiate it from a chapter in the Book of History by the same name. To replace a lost work, it was included along with the Book of Rites and the Etiquette and Ceremonial  becoming one of three ancient ritual texts (the "Three Rites") listed among the classics of Confucianism.

In comparison with other works of its type, the Rite's ruler, though a sage, does not create the state, but merely organizes a bureaucracy. It could not have been composed during the Western Zhou, and was probably based on Warring States period societies. Michael Puett and Mark Edward Lewis compares its system of duties and ranks to the "Legalism" of Shang Yang.

Authorship
The book appeared in the middle of the 2nd century BC, when it was found and included in the collection of Old Texts in the library of Prince Liu De (d. 130 BC), a younger brother of the Han emperor Wu. Its first editor was Liu Xin (c. 50 BC  AD 23), who credited it to the Duke of Zhou. Tradition since at least the Song dynasty continued this attribution, with the claim that Liu Xin's edition was the final one.

In the 12th century, it was given special recognition by being placed among the Five Classics as a substitute for the long-lost sixth work, the Classic of Music.

In the late 19th and early 20th centuries, following Kang Youwei, the book was often seen as a forgery by Liu Xin. Currently, a few holdouts continue to insist on a Western Zhou date while the majority follow Qian Mu and Gu Jiegang in assigning the work to about the 3rd century BC. Yu Yingshi argues for a date in the late Warring States period based on a comparison of titles in the text with extant bronze inscriptions and calendrical knowledge implicit in the work In this view, the word "Zhou" in the title refers not to the Western Zhou but to the royal State of Zhou of the Warring States; the small area still directly under the king's control.

Contents

The book is divided into six chapters:

Offices of the Heaven on general governance;
Offices of Earth on taxation and division of land;
Offices of Spring on education as well as social and religious institutions;
Offices of Summer on the army;
Office of Autumn on justice;
Office of Winter on population, territory, and agriculture.

The work consists mainly of schematic lists of Zhou dynasty bureaucrats, stating what the function of each office is and who is eligible to hold it. Sometimes though the mechanical listing is broken off by pieces of philosophical exposition on how a given office contributes to social harmony and enforces the universal order.

The division of chapters follows the six departments of the Zhou dynasty government. The bureaucrats within a department come in five ranks: minister, councilor, senior clerk, middle clerk and junior clerk. There is only one minister per department -the department head-, but the other four ranks all have multiple holders spread across various specific professions.

In addition to the Etiquette and Ceremonial, the Rites of Zhou contain one of the earliest references to the Three Obediences and Four Virtues, a set of principles directed exclusively at women that formed a core part of female education during the Zhou.

Record of Trades

A part of the Winter Offices, the  Record of Trades, contains important information on technology, architecture, city planning, and other topics. A passage records that, "The master craftsman constructs the state capital. He makes a square nine  on one side; each side has three gates. Within the capital are nine north-south and nine east-west streets. The north-south streets are nine carriage tracks in width".

References

Citations

Sources

Bibliography
 Boltz, William G., 'Chou li' in: Early Chinese Texts. A Bibliographical Guide (Loewe, Michael, ed.), pp. 24–32, Berkeley: Society for the Study of Early China, 1993, (Early China Special Monograph Series No. 2), .

Karlgren, Bernhard, 'The Early History of the Chou li and Tso chuan Texts' in: Bulletin of the Museum of Far Eastern Antiquites, 3 (1931), pp. 1–59
 Nylan, Michael, The Five 'Confucian' Classics, New Haven (Yale University Press), 2001, Chapter 4, The Three Rites Canon pp. 168–202.

External links 
 Rites of Zhou 
 Rites of Zhou 

Chinese classic texts
Confucian texts
Thirteen Classics
Confucian rites